Stanley Kubrick's Boxes is a 2008 documentary film directed by Jon Ronson about the film director Stanley Kubrick.

Film
Ronson's intent was not to create a biography of the filmmaker but rather to understand Kubrick by studying the director's vast personal collection of memorabilia related to his feature films. The documentary came about in 1998 when Ronson received a request from Kubrick's estate for a copy of a documentary Ronson made about the Holocaust (Ronson was unaware that it was Kubrick who was asking for the film until months later). A year later, as Ronson was making plans to conduct a rare interview with the director, Kubrick suddenly died after completing work on his final film Eyes Wide Shut (1999). To his surprise, Ronson was invited to Kubrick's house by his widow. When he arrived, he found that half the house was filled by more than one thousand boxes containing snap shots, newspaper clippings, film out-takes, notes, and fan letters which the director used for research towards each of his films.

External links
 
"Citizen Kubrick"- article by director of documentary
The Stanley Kubrick Archive – University of the Arts London

2008 television films
2008 films
British television films
British documentary films
Documentary films about film directors and producers
Works about Stanley Kubrick
2008 documentary films
Works by Jon Ronson
2000s English-language films
2000s British films